Swipe is a comics term for the intentional copying of a cover, panel, or page from an earlier comic book or graphic novel without crediting the original artist.

Artists Jack Kirby, Neal Adams, Hergé, and Jim Lee are common targets of swipes, though even those artists may not be above reproach; Kirby was known to have swiped from Hal Foster early in his career. Similarly, many Golden Age artists kept "swipe files" of material to be copied as needed. Certain contemporary artists have become notorious for their swiping, including Rich Buckler (who favors Neal Adams and Jack Kirby), Rob Liefeld (many artists), Keith Giffen (José Antonio Muñoz), and Roger Cruz (Jim Lee and Joe Madureira).

There is a long tradition in comics of using fine art as "inspiration" as well. Most observers do not consider this as objectionable as swiping from another cartoonist's work. Examples include Art Spiegelman swiping an image of the Russian artist M. Mazruho's in Maus, Eddie Campbell swiping Diego Velázquez, and Jill Thompson swiping the work of Arthur Rackham.

Cartoonists have also swiped images from mass media and commercial art. Examples include Batman creator Bob Kane repeatedly swiping from early 20th-century illustrator Henry Vallely, Greg Land repeatedly swiping pornography as well as many popular comic book artists, 2000 AD artist Mick Austin swiping an image of Toni Shilleto's from Mayfair: Entertainment for Men, Jon J. Muth swiping a 1940s photograph, and David Chelsea swiping from Spanish pornography. Sometimes the swiping happens "in reverse", as in the example of an illustration from Organic Gardening magazine swiping the iconic Kirby cover for Fantastic Four #1.

Swiping brings to mind the amusing conundrum of whether an artist can swipe from himself. One example is two almost-identical Peanuts strips by Charles Schulz done almost ten years apart. Another comic strip-related ethics question was invoked by latter-day Nancy artists Guy & Brad Gilchrist swiping Nancy creator Ernie Bushmiller.

"Cloning" 
Though not technically swiping, some artists have made a career "cloning" other artists. Phil Jimenez has been quite open about his work being modeled on George Pérez's, though he has never been accused of directly swiping a Pérez drawing. Bryan Hitch started off as an Alan Davis "clone". Bill Sienkiewicz's early work was blatantly derivative of Neal Adams, as was Tom Grindberg's, Michael Netzer (Nasser)'s, and Mike Grell's. Industry veteran Dick Giordano maintained that cloning is not only acceptable, but actually preferable, when an artist fills in for a regular artist on a title.

Appropriation 
Pop artist Roy Lichtenstein made a splash in the 1960s with his "appropriations" based on the work of Kirby, Russ Heath, Tony Abruzzo, Irv Novick, John Romita Sr., and Jerry Grandenetti, who rarely received any credit. Jack Cowart, executive director of the Lichtenstein Foundation, contests the notion that Lichtenstein was a copyist, saying: "Roy's work was a wonderment of the graphic formulae and the codification of sentiment that had been worked out by others. The panels were changed in scale, color, treatment, and in their implications. There is no exact copy." Comics industry figures don't have such a sanguine attitude about Lichtenstein's swipes.

Similarly, Canadian artist Kevin Mutch once drew an entire comic book entirely based on swipes. Mutch's 1993 comic Captain Adam was a "narrative collage" of images and texts from over fifty separate Silver Age and Bronze Age comics, randomly put together to form an original story.

Pastiches 
Comics pastiches are blatant uses of swipes, cloning, and appropriation, usually using the same characters as the original source. French-Canadian cartoonist Yves Rodier is known for his many Adventures of Tintin pastiches, as is the anonymously written comic book The Adventures of Tintin: Breaking Free. In his Masterpiece Comics series, American cartoonist R. Sikoryak cleverly mixes exact cloning of famous cartoonists' styles with classic literary texts, creating unique comics "mash-ups". Alan Moore and Rick Veitch's 1963 series is another example of pastiche in comics form, as are the many take-offs of the Charles Atlas ads found in old comic books.

Homages 
In comics, it is understood that the difference between a swipe and an "homage" is generally whether the source is directly acknowledged — as opposed to being exposed by a third party. Throughout the history of the medium, artists have engaged in homages – most often of well-known cover images like Action Comics No. 1, Detective Comics No. 27, Amazing Fantasy No. 15, and Fantastic Four No. 1. (John Byrne is particularly fond of doing homages to the latter, having produced at least seven versions to date.) Some observers find homages as objectionable as swiping.

Swiping watchdogs 
From 1991 until at least 1997, the industry magazine The Comics Journal kept a "Swipe File" which documented perceived swipes in the comics field, a tradition that continues on the TCJ website.

Artists accused of swiping

See also
 Comic strip switcheroo
 Comics vocabulary
 List of Tintin parodies and pastiches
 Bricolage
 Doujinshi
 Fan fiction
 Homage
 Parody
 Pastiche
 Cheers
 Remix culture

Notes

References 
 Erik Larsen's "One Fan's Opinion" columns at Comic Book Resources on swiping: #15 (November 17, 2005) and #17 (December 1, 2005)
 Best, Daniel. "A Rose by Any Other Name," 20th Century Danny Boy (June 26, 2006) — on the distinction between swipes and homages

External links
 Comics Journal message board "The Swipe File" (currently offline; mirror)
 Kevin Mutch's Captain Adam, including images and information on all its original sources

Comics terminology
Comics involved in plagiarism controversies